Sarah Lynn Lightner is an American politician from Michigan. Lightner is a Republican member of Michigan House of Representatives from District 65.

Early life 
Lightner attended Springport High School.

Education 
Lightner earned an associate degree in Paralegal from Lansing Community College in Lansing, Michigan.

Career 
Lightner and her husband are business owner and operator in hay baling and wrapping, and deer processing.

In 2004, Lightner was a paralegal until 2015.

In 2013, Lightner became a Commissioner for Jackson County, Michigan. In March 2015, Lightner was appointed by Governor Snyder as the Michigan Association of Counties Representative on the Criminal Justice Policy Commission.

On November 6, 2018, Lightner won the election and became a Republican member of Michigan House of Representatives for District 65. Lightner defeated Terri McKinnon and Jason B. Rees with 59.26% of the votes.

Lightner is the vice-chair person of Subcommittee on General Government. Lightner is also the vice-chair person of Subcommittee on Judiciary.

Personal life 
Lightner's husband is David. They have two children. Lightner and her family live in Springport, Michigan.

See also 
 2018 Michigan House of Representatives election

References

External links 
 Sarah Lightner at ballotpedia.org
 2016 news at mlive.com

Living people
County commissioners in Michigan
Republican Party members of the Michigan House of Representatives
21st-century American politicians
21st-century American women politicians
Women state legislators in Michigan
Year of birth missing (living people)